A sexual disorder is a type of medical condition which may refer to:

 Sexual dysfunction (e.g., erectile dysfunction, hypoactive sexual desire disorder, female sexual arousal disorder, anorgasmia, delayed ejaculation, premature ejaculation, spontaneous orgasm, sexual anhedonia, dyspareunia, vaginismus)
 Paraphilia
 Hypersexuality
 Sex offending
 Disorders of sex development
 Sexually transmitted infection